Quercus striatula is a species of oak native to Mexico.

Description
Quercus striatula is low shrub, which spreads by rhizomes.

Distribution and habitat 
It is native to the Sierra Madre Occidental of Chihuahua, Durango, Aguascalientes, and Zacatecas, and several mountain ranges on the Mexican Plateau to the east of the Siera, including mountains in Zacatecas, San Luis Potosí, and Guanajuato.

Ecology
The species grows in areas that have been cleared of understory vegetation by fires. It is generally found under the pines Pinus cooperi, P. teocote, P. leiophylla, and/or the oak Quercus sideroxyla. It is associated with Pinus cembroides and Mimosa aculeaticarpa var. biuncifera in drier areas of the mountains.

References

Flora of the Sierra Madre Occidental
Endemic oaks of Mexico
striatula
Taxa named by William Trelease